Marion Township is one of nine townships in Pike County, Indiana, United States. As of the 2010 census, its population was 724 and it contained 310 housing units.

History
Marion Township was organized in 1857.

Geography

Unincorporated towns
 Hartwell Junction at 
 Survant at 
 Velpen at 
 White Sulphur Springs at 
 Whiteoak at 
(This list is based on USGS data and may include former settlements.)

Cemeteries
The township contains these six cemeteries: Beadles, Bruster Branch, Corn, Flat Creek, Hayes and Walnut Grove.

Lakes
 Patoka Lake

School districts
 Pike County School Corporation

Political districts
 State House District 63
 State Senate District 48

References
 
 United States Census Bureau 2009 TIGER/Line Shapefiles
 IndianaMap

External links
 Indiana Township Association
 United Township Association of Indiana
 City-Data.com page for Marion Township

Townships in Pike County, Indiana
Jasper, Indiana micropolitan area
Townships in Indiana